This article is about the caste system in Goa, and describes the various Jātis or sub-castes to be found among Hindus belonging to the four varnas (Brahmin, Kshatriya, Vaishya, and Shudra), as well as those outside of them. A variation of the traditional Hindu caste system was also retained by the Goan Catholic community, and hence their castes are also mentioned in this article.

Hindu caste system
According to the Gazetteer of India, Union Territory: Goa, Daman and Diu, Part I which looks at Goa (published in 1979) the "chief castes" found in Goa are:

Bhraman
Pancha Gowda Brahmins
Gaud Saraswat Brahmins popularly known as GSBs. They are landowning though most were engaged in clerical jobs, trade, priests and landlords.
Kudaldeshkar Gaud Brahman were landowning class generally associated with agriculture and trade.
Chitrapur Saraswat Brahmin were associated with trade.
Saraswat Brahmins also known as Bhalavalikar Saraswat Brahmins.
Pancha Dravida Brahmins 
The two sub-castes was known as the Padye Brahmins and Bhatt Prabhus, popularly known as "Bhatt" and "Prabhu" respectively, they generally associate themselves with Karhade Brahmins. They are landowning castes and were engaged as temples priests and in agriculture, some into money landing.
Chitpavan Brahmins known as "Konkanastha" and have migrated to Goa from Northern Konkan in ancient times, mostly were employed as priests, astrologers and are well-known horticulturists.
Kramavanta Joshi or Kriyavant Joshi, they were a class of priests who officiated Hindu funeral ceremony and were looked down upon by the above-mentioned castes.

Kshatriya
Kshatriyas of Goa  historically belonged from different Kshatriya clans such as  Shilaharas, Rashtrakutas, Sinsodiyas, Kadambas, Marathas etc and now in present times they are collectively called as 96 Kuli Kshatriya Marathas/Dessais/ 96 Kuli Maratha (Prabhus), Komarpant, Chardo (Catholics) in Goa. Many are landlords of the area and commonly identified by their surnames as Dessais in south Goa and by other surnames in north Goa (Like Ranes, Prabhus, Gaonkars, Parabs, etc) which are specific to locations of Goa.

The community is considered high caste and always been local warlords with high influence in political matters. Recently they have also excelled in fields of medical, education, police force etc. The first war of liberation against the Portuguese rule was also started by Kshatriya community (Dessais of Cuncolim). Known as the Cuncolim revolt of 1583, villagers from Cuncolim killed proselytizing Roman Catholic priests and their armed escorts, who were in the process of converting villagers and desecrating Hindu temples in the region. The Rane revolt against Portuguese rule was also fought by the Kshatriya community (Ranes) of Goa.

Kshatriya Maratha surnames in Goa.

North Goa: Gaonkar, Parab, Dessai, Prabhu, Rane, Naik, Sawant, Dalvi, etc.

South Goa: Dessai, Naik Dessai, Sardesai, Komarpant, Gaonkar, PrabhuDesai, Parab, etc..

Vani
Vaishya/Vaishya Vani: are the traditional community of traders, and are commonly known as Vanis.

Daivadnya Brahmins
Daivadnya popularly known as Shett who are traditional jewellers. Some perform priestly functions for their caste only.

Others

Kalavants
Commonly known as Kalavants and now known as Gomantak Maratha Samaj is a group of various sub-castes who served the temples and the aristocrats in the olden days. Gomantak Maratha is relatively a new ameliorative name (coined in the late 20th century) given to these groups for uniting and emancipating them.

Kharvi
Konkani Kharvi: They term themselves as Kharvis are largely involved in fisheries. Though they are presently a fishing community.

Artisan castes
These include Charis, Chitaris who call themselves Vishwakarma Manu Maya Brahmin, Sutars and Kasars. They are included in the Other Backward Class list of the Government of India.
Rest of castes generally referred to as Shudras or Sudirs in Konkani do not really follow the four-fold varna system, but have recently started claiming higher status. Most of them have been practicing different occupations historically and now are categorized as Other Backward Class by Govt of Goa, these include Madval (Rajak, Dhobi), Gosavi, Shimpi, Khumbar, Teli, Nathjogi, this list also includes Roman Catholic counterparts of few Hindu castes too].

Scheduled Castes of Goa
Following castes are commonly known as Dalits.
Bhangi, Chambhar (Hadi), Mahar, Mahyavanshi (Vankar), Mang

Scheduled Tribes of Goa
Dhodia (Halpati, Naikda (Nayaka), Siddi, Varli Kunbi, Gavda, Velip.
The Gauda and Kunbi are considered as aboriginals by some historians though this claim is disputed.

Historically outside Comunidade

Dhangars
Dhangar, also referred as Gouly or Gavli or Gadaria, is the state’s only ancient pastoral community. In Goa under colonialism, the community kept away from the rest of society as they wanted to escape grazing tax and ban on Kumeri (shifting cultivation) introduced by the Portuguese Empire. Dhangar leaders claim that they had fled to remote hilly and forested areas to avoid religious persecution. They were not part of the Comunidade anywhere in Goa. It is claimed that throughout the Portuguese rule in Goa they were so insulated that not a single Dhangar got converted to Christianity. A study carried out by Government of Goa in 2013 stated that the community had a unique identity, low literacy rate (approximately half the state average) and are known for their martial prowess.

 In Goa, they are classified as Other Backward Classes category in India's system of reservation.

Other religions
In Goa, mass conversions were carried out by Portuguese Catholic missionaries from the 1510 conquest onwards. The Portuguese clergy imposed Portuguese surnames on the converts at the time of Baptism so that it would be difficult to know their original caste easily. The Portuguese authorities also suppressed untouchability among the converts and attempted to homogenize them into a single entity.

However, the converted Hindus retained a variation of their caste status based on patrilineal descent from their previous caste affiliations. The new converts were lumped into new Catholic castes. All Brahmin subcastes (Goud Saraswat Brahmins, Padyes, Daivadnyas), goldsmiths and even some rich merchants, were lumped into the Christian caste of Bamonns (Konkani: Brahmins). The converts from the Kshatriya and Vaishya Vani castes became lumped together as Chardos (Kshatriyas) and those Vaishyas who didn't become Chardos formed a new caste Gauddos. The converts from all the lower castes, as well as the previously Dalit and adivasi groups, were grouped together as  Sudirs, equivalent to Shudras. The Bamonns, Chardos, and Gauddos have been traditionally seen as the high castes in the Goan Catholic caste hierarchy.

See also
Hinduism in Goa

References

Further reading
Gazetteer of India, Union Territory: Goa, Daman and Diu, Part I which looks at Goa (published in 1979)
The Gazette of India, Extraordinary, Part-1, section-1, published by authority, India

Goan society
Hinduism in Goa
Religion in Goa
Caste system in India